The Bolton and Preston Railway connected Bolton and Preston, in Lancashire, England. Its authorising Act of Parliament forbade its early completion to protect the North Union Railway and imposed other restrictions that limited the success of the B&PR. A change of route was authorised to by-pass the delay making it dependent on the goodwill of the NUR to reach Preston. The NUR saw the B&PR as a competitor and used underhand tactics to harm the success of the B&PR.

The B&PR opened the first part of its line in 1841, but faced with extremely difficult ground conditions when constructing a tunnel north of Chorley, it only opened from Bolton to a junction with the NUR at Euxton in 1843.

A bitter rate-cutting war with the NUR ensued, and the B&PR was forced to sell its line to the NUR in 1844. The NUR was taken over and became jointly owned by the London and North Western Railway and the Lancashire and Yorkshire Railway, but in 1888 the Bolton to Euxton section, the original B&PR line, was transferred to the L&YR. The main line is in operation as part of the Manchester to Preston main line.

Proposal

In 1838 the North Union Railway opened its line from Parkside to Preston. Bolton and Preston had important commercial connections but the rail route between them involved a circuitous journey using the Bolton and Leigh Railway to Kenyon Junction and Parkside and the North Union Railway. A direct railway was proposed and a company was formed in 1836. The first chairman was Thomas Ridgway, a Horwich bleacher, and the chief engineer appointed to survey the line was John Urpeth Rastrick.

The line would form an end-on junction with the Manchester and Bolton Railway and run via Chorley and a 690-yard tunnel to meet the Preston and Walton Plateway (Lancaster Canal Tramroad) near its southern terminus at Walton Summit. After following the route of the plateway for one and a half miles, the new line would run into Preston, crossing the River Ribble and tunnelling under Fishergate, to terminate beside the Lancaster Canal basin, at a site occupied by Maxwell House.

The Preston and Walton Plateway had been built in 1803 to link the two portions of the Lancaster Canal across the deep valley of the Ribble. It was double track with a gauge of five feet to the outside of the plates, and was a little under five miles in length. The line had three inclined planes. In Preston it ran down to the level of the Ribble, and then up to the canal terminating on an incline of 1 in 6, worked by a Boulton and Watt stationary engine and an endless chain.

Construction
The Bolton & Preston Railway Bill obtained the Royal Assent in summer of 1837. The B&PR was authorised to acquire the plateway, maintain it and keep it open. Parliament noted that the North Union Railway was under construction and that north of Chorley the B&PR would follow a closely parallel route. To protect the NUR, the B&PR was not permitted to construct this section until three years had elapsed. Capital was to be £380,000.

Reed observes that

This was one of the most complicated and lengthy railway Acts framed up to that time, and had 263 clauses for the 20-mile line. It contained provisions which nullified each other yet left heavy financial commitments and sources of friction in the process; and it provided both the seeds of discord and the ground in which they could sprout and flourish.

The B&PR did not want to accept the delay and may have been deterred by the 1 in 6 gradient of the tramway on the north bank of the Ribble. A second survey by Joseph Jackson followed a different route north of Chorley, via a 300-yard long tunnel under the Chorley to Preston road and joined the NUR at Euxton. A second Act was passed on 4 July 1838. It proved to be a mistake as running over the NUR was "on payment of a toll hereafter to be fixed."

The B&PR was to have a station in Preston adjacent to Maxwell House near the Victoria Hotel on the north side of Fishergate. Although track and a platform were built, the B&PR never used it for passengers but the Lancaster and Preston Junction Railway used it from 1 January 1842. The B&PR had to maintain the tramroad even though it was redundant. Thomas Swinburn was transferred from the Bolton and Leigh Railway to take charge of the tramroad, which remained in use until 1859.

Contracts were let for the line's construction from the end of 1838 as money became available, and on 24 December 1840 Sir Frederick Smith, from the Board of Trade inspected the line. He refused permission to open until gates and signals had been completed. On 26 December some company directors made a trial trip, and it opened as a single line from an end-on junction with the Manchester line at Bolton to a temporary terminus at Rawlinson Bridge on 4 February 1841. Rawlinson Bridge was nine and a quarter miles from Bolton, where the turnpike road crossed the line, close to a canal bridge. In October 1840 agreement was concluded with the Manchester and Bolton Railway to supply engines and rolling stock and the line was extended to Chorley on 24 December 1841.

When work was started on the tunnel north of Chorley, it became obvious that the ground conditions were exceptionally difficult and work was temporarily abandoned until 3 June 1841 when John Stephenson was brought in. He had completed the Summit Tunnel on the Manchester and Leeds Railway. He undertook to complete the work in fifteen months and stood to gain a premium of £1,500 if it was completed within twelve months. Stephenson, despite strenuous efforts, particularly in pumping ground water was unable to complete the work. In April 1842, Rastrick decided the tunnel would have to be abandoned and an open cutting built instead. The tunnel was reduced to 124 yards beneath the Chorley to Preston road. In 1842 the B&PR had insufficient capital to complete the line and another Act of 13 May 1842 increased the capital by £126,500.

Work on the cutting began in early June and within 13 months had been completed: it had a maximum depth of 80 feet, involved the removal of 650,000 cubic yards of earth. Track was laid with bridge-section rails, 49 lb per yard, on longitudinal timbers. According to a report by John Hawkshaw in 1850, nine miles of double track line had been laid with this type of rail on the B&PR and four miles of 60-lb doubleheaded section. General Pasley inspected the line for the Board of Trade, and it opened to Euxton Junction (North Union Junction) on 22 June 1843.

Operation
The line was worked by the M&BR who had agreed to work the Lancaster and Preston Junction Railway from 1 January 1842, intending to work from Manchester to Lancaster when the Bolton and Preston Railway was complete. The North Union Railway lost nearly all of its Bolton to Preston traffic because the B&PR had a shorter route from Manchester to Preston than that of the L&MR and the NUR together and the B&PR was a threat to its business. That the B&PR was dependent on the good will of the NUR for transit from Euxton to Preston gave the NUR an opportunity to harm its competitor's business.

In the first week the B&PR carried 3,697 passengers, but from the outset the NUR made difficulties, obstructing B&PR trains, sometimes causing delays at Preston of over half an hour. The NUR exacted a toll of a shilling per passenger for the  miles, and did what it could to hinder B&PR trains, even preventing their use of the Maxwell House station at Preston. The B&PR was paying £8,000 a year to lease the tramway and the station at Preston, neither of which was necessary, but were required by the Parliamentary Acts. The B&PR had intended to rely on the NUR for rolling stock and engines, but as co-operative working was not forthcoming, the B&PR made agreements with the Manchester and Bolton Railway, the Preston and Wyre Railway, and the Lancaster Canal Company (which had leased the Lancaster and Preston Junction Railway from 1 September 1842). By these agreements passengers could be booked from Manchester and Bolton to Lancaster or Fleetwood and vice versa without change of carriage.

The B&PR charged the same fares from Manchester to Preston as the NUR, but the NUR toll charge was disproportionate: in a single week the NUR toll amounted to about £120. The NUR reduced the first class fare from 7s 6d to 5s first, and a fortnight and later to 3s, and the other classes in proportion. The Manchester-Bolton-Preston companies were obliged to follow . The NUR toll was intolerable on the cheaper fares, and the B&PR directors decided to convey second and third-class passengers from Euxton to Preston by road coach and to apply to Parliament in the next session to revive the earlier powers to reach Preston along the course of the tramroad.

At a meeting of the B&PR on 28 October it was reported that the NUR had refused a revenue sharing arrangement of three-quarters via Bolton and one-quarter via Parkside, and later three-fifths via Bolton. In desperation the B&PR directors proposed amalgamating with the NUR, and at a NUR meeting held in Liverpool it was suggested that the amalgamation should be upon the basis of taking stock of the two companies. The NUR stock was £477,539 and that of the B&PR £262,002. Both companies' fares were restored their original prices on 1 January 1844 and at a general meeting of proprietors of the B&PR on 10 April the draft of the Bill for amalgamation was approved. The Bill received the Royal Assent on 10 May 1844.

Takeover
From 1 January 1846 the NUR was leased jointly by the Grand Junction Railway (which merged into the London and North Western Railway in July 1846) and the Manchester and Leeds Railway (renamed the Lancashire and Yorkshire Railway in 1847). The NUR continued as a wholly owned company until 1888 when it was absorbed by the LNWR and L&YR jointly, and by Act of 26 July, the portions south of Euxton Junction were transferred to the ownership of the companies that used them: Bolton to Euxton Junction, the only part of the Bolton and Preston Railway built became exclusively owned by the L&YR.

The Waterhouse branch, serving several collieries to the south just over eight miles from Bolton, opened some time between 1849 and 1894.

Later years
The Bolton to Euxton line, an important element in the trunk route from Manchester to the north, remained in use through several changes of ownership. The Lancashire and Yorkshire Railway merged with the LNWR in 1922, and the Grouping of the railways followed a year later, under the Railways Act 1921. The line is in use as a major route and was electrified in 2019. The Waterhouse branch has closed, as has the Preston (Maxwell House) station and its approach route.

Stations
The original stations on the B&PR were:
 Bolton built by the Manchester and Bolton Railway opened on 29 May 1838. 
 , the original terminus opened 4 February 1841 and closed on 22 December 1841.
 , opened 22 December 1841.
 , opened on 22 December 1841.
 Euxton, opened on 22 June 1843 and closed on 2 April 1917.
Lostock Lane and Lostock Junction (opening): Lostock Lane first appears in Bradshaw in November 1846: Lancashire and Yorkshire Railway (L&YR) distance diagram of 1851 shows it well west of junction, on way to Horwich; in September 1852 Bradshaw it was replaced by Lostock Junction, timing same, suggesting perhaps just renaming, but diagram evidence makes it clear that was different site. In February 1856 Lostock Lane returned to Bradshaw but had been included in co n of alterations(quoting the Manchester Courier), Lostock Junction still present. Lostock Lane closed on 1 June 1879. and Lostock Junction on 7 November 1966. An attempt to reopen it was declined on 6 February 1897. A new Lostock (or Lostock Parkway in first timetable) opened 16 May 1988 on the site of the former Lostock Junction.
 Chorley Royal Ordnance Factory Platform opened on 24 January 1938 and was renamed Chorley Halt sometime before May 1942. It closed 31 August 1964.
  opened on 30 May 1999.
The convergence with the line from Wigan known as Euxton Junction was situated to the north of both the B&P and the North Union Euxton stations.

Notes

Citations

Bibliography

 

Early British railway companies
Historic transport in Lancashire
Rail transport in Lancashire
History of the Metropolitan Borough of Wigan
Railway companies established in 1837
Railway lines opened in 1841
1837 establishments in the United Kingdom
British companies established in 1837
Pre-grouping British railway companies
London, Midland and Scottish Railway constituents